Porela is a genus of moths in the family Lasiocampidae. The genus was erected by Francis Walker in 1855. All species are known from Australia.

Species
Based on Lepidoptera and Some Other Life Forms:
Porela vetusta Walker, 1855 Queensland, New South Wales, Victoria, South Australia
Porela obtusa (Walker, [1865]) New South Wales
Porela cinerea (Boisduval, 1832)
Porela delineata (Walker, 1855)
Porela amathodes Turner, 1924
Porela rhabditis (Turner, 1932)
Porela ceraunias Turner, 1942
Porela albifinis (Walker, 1855)
Porela vitulina (Donovan, 1805)
Porela galactodes (Lower, 1893)
Porela homospila Turner, 1924
Porela euthyerges Turner, 1941
Porela notodontina (Felder, 1874)
Porela notabilis (Walker, 1855)
Porela subfasciata (Walker, 1855)

External links

Lasiocampidae